The Arameans were an ancient Semitic-speaking people in the Near East, first recorded in historical sources from the late 12th century BCE. The Aramean homeland was known as the land of Aram and encompassed central regions of modern Syria. At the beginning of the 1st millennium BCE, a number of Aramean states were established throughout the western regions of the ancient Near East. The most notable was the Kingdom of Aram-Damascus, which reached its height in the second half of the 9th century BCE during the reign of king Hazael. A distinctive Aramaic alphabet was developed and used to write the Old Aramaic language.

During the 8th century BCE, local Aramean city states were gradually conquered by the Neo-Assyrian Empire. The policy of population displacement and relocation that was applied throughout Assyrian domains also affected Arameans, many of whom were resettled by Assyrian authorities. This caused wider dispersion of Aramean communities throughout various regions of the Near East, and the range of Aramaic language also widened, gradually gaining significance and eventually becoming the common language of public life and administration, particularly during the periods of the Neo-Babylonian Empire (612–539 BCE) and the later Achaemenid Empire (539–330 BCE). As a result of linguistic aramization, a wider Aramaic-speaking area was created throughout the central regions of the Near East, exceeding the boundaries of Aramean ethnic communities. During the later Hellenistic and Roman periods, minor Aramaic-speaking states emerged, the most notable of them being the Kingdom of Osroene, centered in Edessa, the birthplace of Edessan Aramaic, that later came to be known as Classical Syriac language.

Before Christianity came to scene, Aramaic-speaking communities had undergone considerable Hellenization and Romanization in the Near East. Thus, their integration into the Greek-speaking world began a long time before Christianity became established. Some scholars mean that Arameans that accepted Christianity came to be referred to as Syrians by the Greeks. The Arab conquest in the 7th century was followed by Islamization and gradual Arabization of Aramaic-speaking communities throughout the Near East, ultimately resulting in their fragmentation and acculturation. 

During the Early Modern period, study of Aramaic languages (both ancient and modern) was initiated among western scholars, leading to the formation of Aramaic studies as a wider multidisciplinary field that also includes the study of cultural and historical heritage of Arameans. Linguistic and historical aspects of Aramean studies have been widened since the 19th century by archaeological excavations of ancient Aramean sites in the Near East.

History

Origins
The toponym A-ra-mu appears in an inscription at the East Semitic speaking kingdom of Ebla listing geographical names, and the term Armi, which is the Eblaite term for nearby Idlib, occurs frequently in the Ebla tablets (c. 2300 BCE). One of the annals of Naram-Sin of Akkad (c. 2250 BCE) mentions that he captured "Dubul, the ensí of A-ra-me" (Arame is seemingly a genitive form), in the course of a campaign against Simurrum in the northern mountains. Other early references to a place or people of "Aram" have appeared at the archives of Mari (c. 1900 BCE) and at Ugarit (c. 1300 BCE). However, there are no historical, archaeological or linguistic evidences that those early uses of the terms Aramu, Armi or Arame were actually referring to the Arameans. The earliest undisputed historical attestation of Arameans as a people appears much later, in the inscriptions of Tiglath Pileser I (c. 1100 BCE).

Nomadic pastoralists have long played a prominent role in the history and economy of the Middle East, but their numbers seem to vary according to climatic conditions and the force of neighbouring states inducing permanent settlement. The period of the Late Bronze Age seems to have coincided with increasing aridity, which weakened neighbouring states and induced transhumance pastoralists to spend longer and longer periods with their flocks. Urban settlements (hitherto largely Amorite, Canaanite, Hittite, Ugarite inhabited) in The Levant diminished in size, until eventually fully nomadic pastoralist lifestyles came to dominate much of the region. These highly mobile, competitive tribesmen with their sudden raids continually threatened long-distance trade and interfered with the collection of taxes and tribute.

The people who had long been the prominent population within what is today Syria (called the Land of the Amurru during their tenure) were the Amorites, a Northwest Semitic-speaking people who had appeared during the 25th century BCE, destroying the hitherto dominant East Semitic speaking state of Ebla, founding the powerful state of Mari in the Levant, and during the 19th century BCE founding Babylonia in southern Mesopotamia. However, they seem to have been displaced or wholly absorbed by the appearance of a people called the Ahlamu by the 13th century BCE, disappearing from history. Ahlamû appears to be a generic term for Semitic wanderers and nomads of varying origins who appeared during the 13th century BCE across the ancient Near East, Arabian Peninsula, Asia Minor, and Egypt.

The Arameans would appear to be one part of the larger generic Ahlamû group rather than synonymous with the Ahlamu. The presence of the Ahlamû is attested during the Middle Assyrian Empire (1365–1020 BCE), which already ruled many of the lands in which the Ahlamû arose, in the Babylonian city of Nippur and even at Dilmun (modern Bahrain). Shalmaneser I (1274–1245 BCE) is recorded as having defeated Shattuara, King of the Mitanni and his Hittite and Ahlamû mercenaries. In the following century, the Ahlamû cut the road from Babylon to Hattusas, and Tukulti-Ninurta I (1244–1208 BCE) conquered Mari, Hanigalbat and Rapiqum on the Euphrates and "the mountain of the Ahlamû", apparently the region of Jebel Bishri in northern Syria.

Aramean states

The emergence of the Arameans occurred during the Bronze Age collapse (1200–900 BCE), which saw great upheavals and mass movements of peoples across the Middle East, Asia Minor, The Caucasus, East Mediterranean, North Africa, Ancient Iran, Ancient Greece and Balkans, leading to the genesis of new peoples and polities across these regions.

The first certain reference to the Arameans appears in an inscription of Tiglath-Pileser I (1115–1077 BCE), which refers to subjugating the "Ahlamû-Arameans" (Ahlame Armaia). Shortly after, the Ahlamû disappear from Assyrian annals, to be replaced by the Arameans (Aramu, Arimi). This indicates that the Arameans had risen to dominance amongst the nomads. Among scholars, the relationship between the Akhlame and the Arameans is a matter of conjecture. By the late 12th century BCE, the Arameans were firmly established in Syria; however, they were conquered by the Middle Assyrian Empire, as had been the Amorites and Ahlamu before them.

The Middle Assyrian Empire (1365–1050 BCE), which had dominated the Near East and Asia Minor since the first half of the 14th century BCE, began to shrink rapidly after the death of Ashur-bel-kala, its last great ruler in 1056 BCE, and the Assyrian withdrawal allowed the Arameans and others to gain independence and take firm control of what was then Eber-Nari (and is today Syria) during the late 11th century BCE. It is from this point that the region was called Aramea.

Some of the major Aramean speaking city states included: Aram-Damascus, Hamath, Bet-Adini, Bet-Bagyan, Bit-Hadipe, Aram-Bet Rehob, Aram-Zobah, Bet-Zamani, Bet-Halupe, and Aram-Ma'akah, as well as the Aramean tribal polities of the Gambulu, Litau and Puqudu.

Later Biblical sources tell us that Saul, David and Solomon (late 11th to 10th centuries) fought against the small Aramean states ranged across the northern frontier of Israel: Aram-Sôvah in the Beqaa, Aram-Bêt-Rehob (Rehov) and Aram-Ma'akah around Mount Hermon, Geshur in the Hauran, and Aram-Damascus. An Aramean king's account dating at least two centuries later, the Tel Dan Stele, was discovered in northern Israel, and is famous for being perhaps the earliest non-Israelite extra-biblical historical reference to the Israelite royal dynasty, the House of David. In the early 11th century BCE, much of Israel came under foreign rule for eight years according to the Biblical Book of Judges, until Othniel defeated the forces led by Cushan-Rishathaim, who was titled in the Bible as ruler of Aram-Naharaim.

Further north, the Arameans gained possession of Post-Hittite Hamath on the Orontes and were soon to become strong enough to dissociate with the Indo-European speaking Post-Hittite states.

The Arameans, together with Edomites and Ammonites, attacked Israel in the early 11th century, but were defeated. At the same time, Arameans moved to the east of the Euphrates and into Babylonia, where an Aramean usurper was crowned king of Babylon under the name of Adad-apal-iddin.

During the 11th and the 10th centuries BCE, the Arameans conquered Sam'al (modern Zenjirli), also known as Yaudi, the region from Arpad to Aleppo, which they renamed Bît-Agushi, and Til Barsip, which became the chief town of Bît-Adini, also known as Beth Eden. North of Sam'al was the Aramean state of Bit Gabbari, which was sandwiched between the Post-Hittite states of Carchemish, Gurgum, Khattina, Unqi and the Georgian state of Tabal.

One of their earliest semi-independent kingdoms in northern Mesopotamia was Bît-Bahiâni (Tell Halaf).

Under Neo-Assyrian rule

Assyrian annals from the end of the Middle Assyrian Empire c. 1050 BCE and the rise of the Neo-Assyrian Empire in 911 BCE contain numerous descriptions of battles between Arameans and the Assyrian army. The Assyrians would launch repeated raids into Aramea, Babylonia, Ancient Iran, Elam, Asia Minor, and even as far as the Mediterranean, in order to keep its trade routes open. The Aramean city states, like much of the Near East and Asia Minor, were subjugated by the Neo Assyrian Empire (911–605 BCE), beginning with the reign of Adad-nirari II in 911 BCE, who cleared Arameans and other tribal peoples from the borders of Assyria, and began to expand in all directions (See Assyrian conquest of Aram). This process was continued by Ashurnasirpal II, and his son Shalmaneser III, who between them destroyed many of the small Aramean tribes, and conquered the whole of Aramea (modern Syria) for the Assyrians. In 732 BCE Aram-Damascus fell and was conquered by the Assyrian king Tiglath-Pileser III. The Assyrians named their Aramean colonies Eber Nari, whilst still using the term Aramean to describe many of its peoples. The Assyrians conducted forced deportations of hundreds of thousands Arameans into both Assyria and Babylonia (where a migrant population already existed). Conversely, the Aramaic language was adopted as the lingua franca of the Neo-Assyrian Empire in the 8th century BCE, and the native Assyrians and Babylonians began to make a gradual language shift towards Aramaic as the most common language of public life and administration.

The Neo Assyrian Empire descended into a bitter series of brutal internal wars from 626 BCE, weakening it greatly. This allowed a coalition of many its former subject peoples; the Babylonians, Chaldeans, Medes, Persians, Parthians, Scythians, Sagartians and Cimmerians to attack Assyria in 616 BCE, sacking Nineveh in 612 BCE, and finally defeating it between 605 and 599 BCE. During the war against Assyria, hordes of horse borne Scythian and Cimmerian marauders ravaged through Aramea and all the way into Egypt.

As a result of migratory processes, various Aramean groups were settled throughout the Ancient Near East, and their presence is recorded in the regions of Assyria, Babylonia, Anatolia, Phoenicia, Palestine, Egypt, and Northern Arabia.

Population transfers, conducted during the Neo-Assyrian Empire and followed by gradual linguistic aramization of non-Aramean populations, created a specific situation in the regions of Assyria proper, among ancient Assyrians, who originally spoke ancient Assyrian language (a dialect of Akkadian), but later accepted Aramaic language.

Under Neo-Babylonian rule
Aramea/Eber-Nari was then ruled by the succeeding Neo-Babylonian Empire (612–539 BCE), initially headed by a short lived Chaldean dynasty. The Aramean regions became a battleground between the Babylonians and the Egyptian 26th Dynasty, which had been installed by the Assyrians as vassals after they had conquered Egypt, ejected the previous Nubian dynasty and destroyed the Kushite Empire. The Egyptians, having entered the region in a belated attempt to aid their former Assyrian masters, fought the Babylonians (initially with the help of remnants of the Assyrian army) in the region for decades before being finally vanquished.

The Babylonians remained masters of the Aramean lands only until 539 BCE, when the Persian Achaemenid Empire overthrew Nabonidus, the Assyrian born last king of Babylon, who had himself previously overthrown the Chaldean dynasty in 556 BCE.

Under Achaemenid rule

The Arameans were later conquered by the Achaemenid Empire (539–332 BCE). However, little changed from the Neo-Assyrian and Neo-Babylonian times, as the Persians, seeing themselves as successors of previous empires, maintained Imperial Aramaic language as the main language of public life and administration. Provincial administrative structures also remained the same, and the name Eber Nari still applied to the region.

Under Seleucid and Ptolemaic rule

Conquests of Alexander the Great (336-323 BCE) marked the beginning of a new era in the history of the entire Near East, including regions inhabited by Arameans. By the end of the 4th century BCE, two newly created Hellenistic states emerged as main pretenders for regional supremacy: the Seleucid Empire (305–64 BCE), and the Ptolemaic Empire (305–30 BCE). Several conflicts, known in historiography as the Syrian Wars, were fought during the 3rd and the 2nd century BCE between those two powers, over the control of regions that came to be known as "Coele Syria" (meaning: the whole Syria), a term derived from an older Aramean designation (the whole Aram). Since earlier times, ancient Greeks were commonly using "Syrian" labels as designations for Arameans and heir lands, but is during the Hellenistic (Seleucid-Ptolemaic) period that the term Syria was finally defined, as designation for regions western of Euphrates, as opposed to the term Assyria, that designated regions further to the east.

During the 3rd century BCE, various narratives related to the history of earlier Aramean states became accessible to wider audiences after the translation of Hebrew Bible into Greek language. Known as Septuagint, the translation was created in Alexandria, capital city of Ptolemaic Egypt, that was the most important city of the Hellenistic world, and also one of the main centers of Hellenization. Influenced by Greek terminology, translators decided to adopt ancient Greek custom of using "Syrian" labels as designations for Arameans and their lands, thus abandoning endonymic (native) terms, that were used in the Hebrew Bible. In the Greek translation (Septuagint), the region of Aram was commonly labeled as "Syria", while Arameans were labeled as "Syrians". 

Reflecting on traditional influences of Greek terminology on English translations of the Septuagint, American orientalist Robert W. Rogers (d. 1930) noted in 1921: "it is most unfortunate that Syria and Syrians ever came into the English versions. It should always be Aram and the Aramaeans".

Under Roman and Parthian rule

After the establishment of Roman rule in the region of Syria proper (western of Euphrates) during the 1st century BCE, Aramean lands became the frontier region between two empires, Roman and Parthian, and later between their successor states, Byzantine and Sasanid empires. Several minor states also existed in frontier regions, most notable of them being the Kingdom of Osroene, centered in the city of Edessa, known in Aramaic language as Urhay.

In Greek sources, particularity two writers spoke clearly on the Arameans. Posidonius, born in Apamea, as quoted by Strabo, wrote that "Those people whom we Greeks call Syrioi, call themselves Aramaioi". Further, Josephus, born in Jerusalem, define the regions of "Aram's sons" as the Tranchonitis, Damascus "midway between Palestine and Coelo-Syria", Armenia, Bactria, and the Mesene around Spasini Charax.

Between the 1st and the 3rd centuries AD, ancient Arameans adopted Christianity, thus replacing the old polytheistic Aramean religion. In the same time, Christian Bible was translated into Aramaic, and by the 4th century local Aramaic dialect of Edessa (Urhay) developed into a literary language, known as Edessan Aramaic (Urhaya).

One of the most prominent Christian authors from that period was saint Ephrem of Edessa (d. 373), whose works contain several endonymic (native) references to his language (Aramaic), homeland (Aram) and people (Arameans). He was thus praised, by theologian Jacob of Serugh (d. 521), as the crown or wreath of the Arameans, and the same praises were repeated in liturgical texts.

Under Byzantine and Sassanid rule

During the Late Antiquity and the Early Middle Ages, the Greek custom of using Syrian labels for Arameans and their language started to gain acceptance among an Aramaic-speaking literary and ecclesiastical elites. The practice of using Syrian labels as designations for Arameans and their language was very common among ancient Greeks, and under their influence it also became common among Romans and Byzantines. 

In the Septuagint (Greek translation of the Hebrew Bible) and Greek books of the New Testament, Syrian labels as designations for Arameans and their land (Aram) was common. By the beginning of the 5th century, that practice also started to affect terminology of Aramaic-speaking ecclesiastical and literary elites, and Syrian labels started to gain frequency and acceptance not only in Aramean translations of Greek works, but also in original works of Aramaic writers. Following the example of their elites, it became common among Aramaic-speakers to use not only endonymic (native), but also exonymic (foreign) designations, thus creating a specific duality that persisted throughout the Middle Ages, as attested in works of prominent writers, who used both designations, Aramean/Aramaic and Syrian/Syriac.

Since Edessan Aramaic language (Urhaya) was the main liturgical language of Aramaic Christianity, it also became known as Edessan Syriac, later defined by western scholars as Classical Syriac, thus creating a base for the term Syriac Christianity.

An Arabization process was initiated after the Arab conquest in the 7th century. In the religious sphere of life, Aramaic-speaking Christians (e.g. Melkites in Palestine) were exposed to Islamization, which created a base for gradual acceptance of Arabic language, not only as the dominant language of Islamic prayer and worship, but also as a common language of public and domestic life. Acceptance of Arabic language became the main vessel of gradual Arabization of Aramean communities throughout the Near East, ultimately resulting in their fragmentation and acculturation. Those processes affected not only Islamized Aramaic-speakers, but also some of those who remained Christians, thus creating local communities of Arabic-speaking Christians of Syriac Christian origin, who spoke Arabic in their public and domestic life, but continued to belong to Churches that used liturgical Aramaic/Syriac language.

Under Arab and Turkish rule
Since the Arab conquest of the Near East in the 7th century, remaining communities of Christian Arameans converged around local ecclesiastical institutions, that were by that time already divided along denominational lines. Among those in western regions, including Syria and Palestine, majority adhered to the Oriental Orthodoxy, under jurisdiction of the Oriental Orthodox Patriarchate of Antioch, while minority belonged to the Eastern Orthodoxy, under jurisdiction of local patriarchates of Antioch and Jerusalem. In spite of the fact that Eastern Orthodox patriarchates were dominated by Greek episcopate and Greek linguistic and cultural traditions, the use of Aramaic language in liturgical and literary life persisted throughout the Middle Ages, up to the 14th century, embodied in the use of a specific regional dialect known as the Christian Palestinian Aramaic language. On the other side, within the Oriental Orthodox community, dominant liturgical and literary language was Edessan Aramaic, that later became known as Classical Syriac, and the Oriental Orthodox Patriarchate of Antioch itself came to be known as the Syriac Orthodox Church.

During the 10th century, Byzantine Empire gradually reconquered much of northern Syria and upper Mesopotamia, including the cities of Melitene (934) and Antioch (969), thus liberating local Aramaic-speaking Christian communities from the Muslim rule. Byzantines favored Eastern Orthodoxy, but leadership of the Antiochian Oriental Orthodox Patriarchate succeeded in reaching agreement with the Byzantine authorities, thus securing religious tolerance. Byzantines extended their rule up to Edessa (1031), but were forced into a general retreat from Syria during the course of the 11th century, pushed back by the newly arrived Seljuk Turks, who took Antioch (1084). Later establishment of Crusader states (1098), the Principality of Antioch and the County of Edessa, created new challenges for local Aramaic-speaking Christians, both Oriental Orthodox and Eastern Orthodox.

Among the ecclesiastical and literary elites of the Antiochian Oriental Orthodox Patriarchate, traditions related to the Aramean heritage, along with other ancient civilizations, persisted throughout the medieval period. The use of designations for Aramaic language  and Aramean people in general could be found along with the use of Syrian designations, as attested by the works of prominent writers.

Culture

Language

Arameans were mostly defined by their use of the West Semitic Old Aramaic language (1100 BCE – 200 CE), first written using the Phoenician alphabet, over time modified to a specifically-Aramaic alphabet.

As early as the 8th century BCE, Aramaic competed with the East Semitic Akkadian language and script in Assyria and Babylonia, and it spread then throughout the Near East in various dialects. By around 800 BCE, Aramaic had become the lingua franca of the Neo-Assyrian Empire, continuing during the Achaemenid period as Imperial Aramaic. Although marginalized by Greek in the Hellenistic period, Aramaic in its varying dialects remained unchallenged as the common language of all Semitic peoples of the region until the Arab Islamic conquest of Mesopotamia in the 7th century AD, when it became gradually superseded by Arabic.

The late Old Aramaic language of the Neo-Assyrian Empire, Neo-Babylonian Empire and Achaemenid Persian Empire developed into the Middle Aramaic Syriac language of Persian Assyria, which would become the liturgical language of Syriac Christianity. The descendant dialects of this branch of Eastern Aramaic, which still retains Akkadian loanwords, still survive as the spoken and written language of the Assyrian people. It is found mostly in northern Iraq, northwestern Iran, southeastern Turkey and northeastern Syria and, to a lesser degree, in migrant communities in Armenia, Georgia, southern Russia, Lebanon, Israel, Jordan and Azerbaijan as well as in diaspora communities in the West, particularly the United States, Canada, Great Britain, Sweden, Australia and Germany. A small number of Israeli Jews, particularly those originating from Iraq and, to a lesser degree, Iran and eastern Turkey, still speak  Eastern Aramaic, but it is largely being eroded by Hebrew, especially within the Israeli-born generations.

The Western Aramaic dialect is now only spoken by Muslims and Christians in Ma'loula, Jubb'adin and Bakhah. Mandaic is spoken by up to 75,000 speakers of the ethnically-Mesopotamian Gnostic Mandaean sect, mainly in Iraq and Iran.

Religion

It appears from their inscriptions as well as from their names that Arameans worshipped Mesopotamian gods such as Haddad (Adad), Sin, Ishtar (whom they called Astarte), Shamash, Tammuz, Bel and Nergal, and Canaanite-Phoenician deities such as the storm-god, El, the supreme deity of Canaan, in addition to Anat (‘Atta) and others.

The Arameans who lived outside their homelands apparently followed the traditions of the country where they settled. The King of Damascus, for instance, employed Phoenician sculptors and ivory-carvers. In Tell Halaf-Guzana, the palace of Kapara, an Aramean ruler (9th century BCE), was decorated with orthostates and with statues that display a mixture of Mesopotamian, Hittite, and Hurrian influences.

Between the 1st and 4th centuries AD, the Arameans began to adopt Christianity in place of the polytheist Aramean religion, and the regions of the Levant and Mesopotamia became an important centre of Syriac Christianity, along with the Aramean kingdom Osroene to the east from where the Syriac language and Syriac script emerged.

Legacy and modern Aramean identity

Legacy of ancient Arameans became of particular interest for scholars during the Early Modern period, resulting in the emergence of Aramaic studies, as a distinctive field dedicated to the study of Aramaic language and Aramean cultural heritage in general. By the 19th century, the Aramean question was formulated, and several scholarly theses were proposed regarding the development of Aramaic language, and the history of Arameans.

Some of those questions were focused on contemporary issues, related to the uses of Aramean/Aramaic, Syrian/Syriac, Assyrian and Chaldean designations. In 1875, Henry Van-Lennep (d. 1889), who was working as an American missionary among Eastern Christians in the Ottoman Near East, stated that Arameans are "better known as the Syrians, the Assyrians, and the Chaldeans", and also added: "The name Aramean is generally applied to all the inhabitants of the country which extends from the eastern boundary of Assyria to the Mediterranean, exclusive of Asia Minor proper and Palestine". Van-Lennep also stated that Arameans are divided in two branches, eastern ("the Eastern Arameans, or Assyrians, now called Chaldeans"), and western ("the Western Arameans, or modern Syrians").

Some of those pan-Aramean views were later accepted by other western researchers, who also held that modern Syrians are descendants of Arameans. In 1888, British anthropologist George T. Bettany (d. 1891) thus noted that "The modern Semitic people occupying Syria are most accurately termed Aramaeans". In 1919, Irish orientalist Edmond Power (d. 1953) pointed to several questions related to Christian Arameans in modern Syria, noting that "It is in Northern Mesopotamia and Western Syria that the more ancient Aramean element is best preserved owing to the survival of Christianity in these districts".

During the 20th century, the notion of Aramean continuity clashed with the notion of Assyrian continuity, resulting in a series of disputes that remain unresolved. In modern times, Aramean identity is mainly held by a number of Syriac Christians in southeastern Turkey, parts of Syria, Iraq and Lebanon, and in the Aramean diaspora, especially in Germany and Sweden. In 2014, Israel officially recognized Arameans as a distinctive minority. Questions related to minority rights of Arameans in some other countries were also brought to international attention.

See also

 Aramean kings
 Arameans in Israel
 Israelite-Aramean War
 Luwian-Aramean states
 Mhallami
 Paddan Aram

References

Sources

External link

 
States and territories established in the 12th century BC
States and territories disestablished in the 8th century BC
Shem